Məşədilər, Tovuz may refer to:
Məşədilər (40° 51' N 45° 42' E), Tovuz, Azerbaijan
Məşədilər (40° 53' N 45° 45' E), Tovuz, Azerbaijan